Boris Mikhailovich Shavlokhov (born 12 June 1996) is a Russian footballer.

Shavlokhov was born in Gudauta, Abkhazia, and moved to Moscow with his family at the age of 6. He was enrolled in the Spartak academy, spent a year at FC FShM Torpedo Moscow, before returning to Spartak.

When he was 16, Shavlokhov joined FC Rubin Kazan, where he played 8 matches and scored 1 goal during the seasons of 2012/13 and 2013/14. After the coach Kurban Berdyev's departure in 2014, Shavlokhov transferred to FC Krasnodar, where he made his professional debut in the Russian Professional Football League on 26 August 2014 in a game against FC Druzhba Maykop. For the rest of the year, he played 10 matches for FC Krasnodar, and 9 matches as a substitute.

At the end of July 2016, he signed a contract with the Belarusian Premier League club FC Granit Mikashevichi, for which he played 14 matches until the end of the championship.

References

External links
 Career summary by sportbox.ru
 
 

1996 births
People from Gudauta
Living people
Russian footballers
Russian expatriate footballers
Expatriate footballers in Belarus
FC Granit Mikashevichi players
FC Rubin Kazan players
Association football midfielders
Belarusian Premier League players
Russian people of Abkhazian descent
FC Krasnodar-2 players